Dropped Pianos is an EP by Tim Hecker, released on October 10, 2011 by Kranky. It was recorded in early 2010 in Montreal and Banff, Canada, before its companion album, Ravedeath, 1972.

The EP is described as an "inversion" of Ravedeath, released previously in 2011. Its tone is "starker and colder" than its predecessor, deemed "intimate" whilst Ravedeath is described as "grand".

Track listing
All songs written and composed by Tim Hecker.
 "Sketch 1" – 7:09
 "Sketch 2" – 3:57
 "Sketch 3" – 1:20
 "Sketch 4" – 2:56
 "Sketch 5" – 4:58
 "Sketch 6" – 1:24
 "Sketch 7" – 3:26
 "Sketch 8" – 1:43
 "Sketch 9" – 5:32

Personnel
Musicians 
Tim Hecker – writing, recording and production

Other personnel 
Steve Bates – recording assistant
Mell Dettmer – mastering
Radwan Moumneh – recording assistant
David Nakamoto – album artwork

References
Citations

2011 albums
Tim Hecker albums
Kranky albums